Lynn Crawford (born July 18, 1964) is a Canadian chef and television personality. She is known for her appearances on the Food Network show Restaurant Makeover, which is seen in over 16 countries worldwide.

Biography 
Lynn Crawford was born July 18, 1964 in Toronto, Ontario, Canada. She trained at George Brown College in Toronto. She apprenticed under Alice Waters.

She was formerly the executive chef at the Four Seasons in Toronto and the former executive chef of the Four Seasons in New York.

From 2010 until 2021 she co-founded and co-owned, alongside Lora Kirk, the table d’hôte restaurant Ruby Watchco in Toronto.

Television appearances 
She appeared on the Food Network's Iron Chef America (the third chef from Canada to do so), in a battle with Iron Chef Bobby Flay. The episode first aired on March 7, 2007, with peanut as the theme ingredient. Crawford lost the battle to Chef Flay.

In 2010, Crawford debuted a Food Network Canada series entitled Pitchin' In, in which she goes out to take on the challenge of getting the freshest and best ingredients. In the same year she launched Ruby Watchco, a table d'hôte restaurant, in Toronto's Riverside neighbourhood. In 2010, she was nominated for a Gemini Award in the Best Host in a Lifestyle/Practical Information, or Performing Arts Program or Series category for the Pitchin' In shrimp episode.  In 2014, Crawford was nominated for Canadian Screen Award in the category of Lifestyle Program or Series for Pitchin In.

In 2013, Crawford was a contestant on Top Chef Masters, along with her spouse Lora Kirk. Crawford and Kirk published the cookbook Hearth & Home: Cook, Share and Celebrate Family Style in 2021.

In 2018, Crawford was the Iron Chef for the debut of Iron Chef Canada, a Food Network Canada series. She is one of five Iron Chefs in the series, along with Hugh Acheson, Amanda Cohen, Rob Feenie and Susur Lee.

Personal life 
Crawford is a lesbian. She has many tattoos and likes motorcycles. Her former partner was Joy Lachita, a schoolteacher and playwright.

Filmography

Awards and nominations

References

External links
Food Network profile

Ruby Watchco (copy archived May 5, 2020)

1964 births
Living people
Businesspeople from Toronto
Canadian television chefs
Participants in Canadian reality television series
Canadian restaurateurs
Women restaurateurs
George Brown College alumni
Canadian cookbook writers
Writers from Toronto
Women chefs
Canadian lesbian writers
21st-century Canadian non-fiction writers
21st-century Canadian women writers
Canadian LGBT broadcasters
Canadian women chefs
LGBT chefs
Chefs from Toronto
21st-century Canadian LGBT people